Richi Solaiman (Bengali:রিচি সোলায়মান) is a Bangladeshi film & television actress and model. She has acted in more than 100 television dramas.

Early life 
Solaiman was born in Dhaka, Bangladesh. Her father M. M. Solaiman was a businessman. She took her early education from Saint Judes tutorial School, Dhaka. After completing her school education she pursued a bachelor's degree in Business administration from Asia Pacific University in Dhaka.

Career 
Richi started her career as an actress through the serial "Bela O Bela"(1998) cast opposite Tony Diaz produced by Farhuq Bhuiyan aired on BTV. She established herself as one of Bangladeshi media's leading actresses and accomplished dancer. Till 2015, Solaiman worked in many famous Telefilms, Dramas, Serials, TV commercials. She made her acting debut in big screen in the film Nirab Prem directed by Shahnewaz Kakoli.

Personal life
Richi married to an American expatriate Rashek Malik on December 14, 2008. They have a son named Rayan Ridwan Mallik and a daughter named Ilma Rayan Malik.

Filmography
 ''Hadar Bhalobasa (unreleased )

Dramas

See also 
 Afsana Mimi

References 

Living people
Bangladeshi film actresses
Bengali television actresses
Year of birth missing (living people)
Best TV Actress Meril-Prothom Alo Critics Choice Award winners